.mc is the Internet country code top-level domain (ccTLD) for the Principality of Monaco.

Second-level domains
Registrations are made directly at the second level, or under these names:

 .tm.mc: registered trademarks (registered in Monaco or internationally with WIPO)
 .asso.mc: associations (must be chartered in Monaco)

Second-level registrations require a company registration in Monaco.

References

External links
 IANA .mc whois information
 .mc domain registration website

Country code top-level domains
Economy of Monaco

sv:Toppdomän#M